The Unto Wiitala trophy is an ice-hockey award given by the Finnish Liiga to the best referee of the season. It is named after Unto Wiitala a Finnish goalkeeper who competed in the 1950s and became a referee after his playing career.

Trophy winners

References

Finnish awards
Liiga trophies and awards